Samuel Sheldon Poole (March 25, 1751 – October 7, 1835) was a judge and politician in Nova Scotia. He represented Yarmouth Township in the Nova Scotia House of Assembly from 1785 to 1799, from 1806 to 1811 and from 1814 to 1835.

Samuel Sheldon Poole was born in Reading, Massachusetts, the son of Jonathan Poole and Mary Sheldon. He was educated at Harvard University and Yarmouth. In 1775 he married Elizabeth Barnes. In 1785, he was named a Justice of the Peace for Queen's County. Poole later was named a justice in the Inferior Court of Common Pleas for Shelburne County and a judge in the probate court. He also served as custos rotulorum and was the first teacher for the Yarmouth Grammar School, established in 1811. After the death of Samuel Marshall, Poole was elected again to the provincial assembly in an 1814 by-election. In 1826, he was referred to as the "father of the house" by Governor James Kempt. He appealed his loss to Reuben Clements in the 1830 general election and regained his seat in the assembly the following year. Poole died in office at the age of 84.

References 
 Campbell, JR History of the County of Yarmouth (1876)
 A Directory of the Members of the Legislative Assembly of Nova Scotia, 1758-1958, Public Archives of Nova Scotia (1958)

1751 births
1835 deaths
Harvard University alumni
Nova Scotia pre-Confederation MLAs
Colony of Nova Scotia judges